George Anthony Brown (born May 17, 1911) was the head football coach of the Montclair State University Red Hawks in Upper Montclair, New Jersey for the 1953 season, compiling a 4–1 record. He was born in Ohio.

Brown worked as a director of athletics at Milligan college in Tennessee, before joining Upper Iowa University as head basketball and football line coach.

Brown played for the New York Giants American football team.

Brown married Margaret Elizabeth Ferri in 1939.

Head coaching record

References

1911 births
Possibly living people
Montclair State Red Hawks football coaches